The Black Crowes is an American Southern rock band from Atlanta, Georgia. Originally formed by brothers Chris (lead vocals) and Rich Robinson (guitar) in 1984 as Mr Crowe's Garden, the group went through a series of early personnel changes before settling on a lineup including lead guitarist Jeff Cease, bassist Johnny Colt and drummer Steve Gorman in 1989. The current lineup of the band, which reformed in November 2019 after breaking up for a third time in 2015, includes the Robinson brothers, longtime bassist Sven Pipien, and new members Isaiah Mitchell (lead guitar), Raj Ojha (drums) and Joel Robinow (keyboards).

History

1984–2002
Brothers Chris and Rich Robinson formed Mr. Crowe's Garden in 1984, working with a succession of six bassists and three drummers during the band's formative years. Early members included Keith Joyner (bass), Jeff Sullivan (drums), and Ted Selke (bass). By 1989, the group had been renamed the Black Crowes and featured rhythm guitarist Jeff Cease, bassist Johnny Colt and drummer Steve Gorman. After the release of the group's debut album Shake Your Money Maker, Cease was replaced by former Burning Tree guitarist Marc Ford in November 1991. Eddie Harsch was added as the band's first keyboardist the following year. After three more studio albums, Ford was dismissed in August 1997 due to a heroin addiction, before Colt left shortly thereafter in October.

Colt was replaced by Sven Pipien for By Your Side, on which both lead and rhythm guitars were performed by Rich Robinson. Audley Freed joined as a touring guitarist for shows starting in June 1998. In May 2000, Pipien was replaced by Greg Rzab, debuting on a tour with former Led Zeppelin guitarist Jimmy Page following the release of Live at the Greek. Rzab had left by the end of the year, and Rich Robinson played bass on the 2001 release Lions. Andy Hess took over Rzab's vacated position once the album was recorded, debuting in February 2001. After a final tour which spawned a live release simply titled Live, Gorman left the Black Crowes in December 2001 and the remaining members announced the band's "indefinite hiatus" the following month.

2005 onward
After a three-year hiatus, the Black Crowes reformed in March 2005 with a lineup of Chris and Rich Robinson, former members Marc Ford and Sven Pipien, and new drummer Bill Dobrow. Within two months, Gorman had returned as the band's drummer. After a tour which spawned the live release Freak 'n' Roll... Into the Fog, Harsch left in August 2006 due to "health reasons" and was replaced by Rob Clores. Just over a week later, Ford also left the band citing "health reasons", with Paul Stacey taking his place for upcoming tour dates. Clores was dismissed and replaced by Adam MacDougall in July 2007, and in November Luther Dickinson joined as second guitarist, after having performed on Warpaint. After a final tour, the band went on "indefinite hiatus" again in July 2011.

The Black Crowes announced its return again on Christmas Day 2012 with Jackie Greene taking Dickinson's place in the band for tour dates starting the following March. The tour was followed by a period of extended inactivity before Rich Robinson formally announced in January 2015 that the Black Crowes had broken up due to a disagreement between him and brother Chris regarding ownership of the band.

However, in November 2019 after several weeks of rumors, it was announced that the Black Crowes had reunited for a planned 2020 tour in commemoration of the 30th anniversary of Shake Your Money Maker, with a new lineup including the Robinson brothers, rhythm guitarist Isaiah Mitchell, bassist Tim Lefebvre, drummer Raj Ojha and keyboardist Joel Robinow.

Members

Current

Former

Timeline

Lineups

References

External links
The Black Crowes official website

Black Crowes, The